Vandenbergh is a surname. Notable people with the surname include:

Erwin Vandenbergh (born 1959), Belgian footballer
John Vandenbergh, Professor Emeritus of zoology at North Carolina State University
Kevin Vandenbergh (born 1983), Belgian footballer
Lydia Vandenbergh (born 1984), American soccer midfielder
Sarah Vandenbergh (born 1972), Australian actress
Stijn Vandenbergh (born 1984), professional road racing cyclist

See also
Vandenbergh's Regiment of Militia
Vandenbergh effect, early induction of the first estrous cycle in prepubertal female mice using male mouse urine
 Van den Bergh reaction, a lab test to measure bilirubin in a blood sample

fr:Vandenbergh